Guto is a Welsh given name; it can be the diminutive form of Gruffudd, Augusto or Gustavo. Notable persons with that name include:

Guto Bebb (born 1968), Welsh Conservative MP
Guto Harri (born 1966), Welsh broadcaster, writer and communications consultant
Guto Nyth Brân (1700–1737), Welsh athlete
Guto Pryce (born 1972), bass guitar player in the band Super Furry Animals
Guto Puw (born 1971), Welsh composer, university lecturer and conductor
Guto'r Glyn (1435–1493), Welsh language poet
Guto (footballer, born 1976), full name Adelton Gomes da Silva, Brazilian football goalkeeper
Guto (footballer, born 1988), full name Augusto Pacheco Fraga, Brazilian football striker
Carlos Augusto Filho (born 1986), Brazilian mixed martial artist and kickboxer; known as Guto Inocente

See also
Guto Wayu, one of the 180 woredas in the Oromia Region of Ethiopia